The 1912 Tacloban typhoon is a typhoon hit Tacloban, Philippines in 1912. It has been pointed out that this typhoon was very similar to Typhoon Haiyan in November 2013 (about 100 years later).

Overview 
In November 1912, a typhoon swept through the central Philippines and "practically destroyed" Tacloban. In Tacloban and Capiz on the island of Panay, the death toll was 15,000, half the population of those cities at the time. 

Tacloban was devastated by Super Typhoon Haiyan in 2013, 101 years later. In other words, a similar catastrophe occurred about a century after the 1912 typhoon. However, there was no report that the lessons of the 1912 typhoon were passed down. In other words, despite the devastating damage caused by Typhoon 1912, it was largely forgotten 101 years later. So when Typhoon Haiyan hit Tacloban, the interesting fact that a similar catastrophe had occurred about 100 years ago was revealed once again. Due to this, 2013 Haiyan was also called "100-Year Storm".

References

See also 
Typhoon Haiyan (2013)

Typhoons in the Philippines
1912 in the Philippines
Tacloban
November 1912 events